Vologases II was a Parthian prince who competed against his brother Pacorus II for the Parthian crown from 78, until his defeat in 80.

References

Sources 
 
  

80 deaths
1st-century Parthian monarchs
1st-century births
1st-century Iranian people